Jerdon's day gecko (Cnemaspis jerdonii) is a species of gecko, a lizard in the family Gekkonidae. The species is endemic to India and Sri Lanka.

Etymology
The specific name, jerdonii, is in honor of British biologist Thomas C. Jerdon.

Description
In habit, Cnemaspis jerdonii is similar to Cnemaspis kandianus and Cnemaspis gracilis. Its digits are not dilated, but with rather large plates under the basal part, the most distal of these plates being the largest and longitudinally oval in shape. Its upper surface is covered with uniform, small granules, smooth on the back, a little larger and keeled on the snout; a few erect spine-like tubercles are on the flanks. The rostral is four-sided, nearly twice as broad as deep, with a median cleft above; the nostrils are pierced between the rostral and the three nasals; eight to 10 upper and seven or eight lower labials are present; the mental is large, triangular or pentagonal, with small chin-shields passing gradually into the granules of the throat, which are rather large, flat, and smooth. Ventral scales are hexagonal, imbricate, and smooth. The male has five to 12 femoral pores on each side, with no preanal pores. The tail is cylindrical, tapering, and covered with  smooth scales, in its basal half with a few scattered larger tubercles; the median series of subcaudals is enlarged. In color, it is grey-brown above, clouded with darker; the small lateral spines are white, sometimes with a black cervical spot; it is whitish beneath, the throat is sometimes brown-dotted.

References

Further reading
Boulenger GA (1885). Catalogue of the Lizards in the British Museum (Natural History). Second Edition. Volume I. Geckonidæ, Eublepharidæ, Uroplatidæ, Pygopodidæ, Agamidæ. London: Trustees of the British Museum (Natural History). (Taylor and Francis, printers). xii + 436 pp. + Plates I-XXXII. (Gonatodes jerdonii, new combination, p. 71).
Ferguson W (1877). Reptile Fauna of Ceylon: Letter on a Collection sent to the Colombo Museum. Colombo: William Henry Herbert, Government Printer. 42 pp.
Smith MA (1935). The Fauna of British India, Including Ceylon and Burma. Reptilia and Amphibia. Vol. II.—Sauria. London: Secretary of State for India in Council. (Taylor and Francis, printers). xiii + 440 pp. + Plate I + 2 maps. ("Cnemaspis jerdoni [sic]", new combination, pp. 74–75).
Taylor EH (1953). "A review of the lizards of Ceylon". Univ. Kansas Sci. Bull., Lawrence 35: 1525-1585.
Theobald W (1868). "Catalogue of Reptiles in the Museum of the Asiatic Society of Bengal". J. Asiatic Soc. Bengal, Calcutta 37 (2) (extra number 146): vi + 7-88. (Gymnodactylus jerdonii, new species, p. 31).

Cnemaspis
Reptiles described in 1868